The Son of Odin is the debut album of British heavy metal band Elixir, released in 1986 on 12" vinyl. Cult Metal Classics re-released the album on CD in 2001. The album also included 3 bonus tracks. The album was also released on CD by TPL records in 2004, Majestic Rock in 2006 and CTR in 2011 as a 25th Anniversary Edition. In issue 137 (November 2005) of Terrorizer magazine, the album was included in the top 20 power metal albums of all time, alongside Judas Priest's Painkiller, Helloween's Keeper of the Seven Keys Part II and Cirith Ungol's King of the Dead. In 2019, Metal Hammer ranked it as the 21st best power metal album of all time.

Track listing

Personnel
Elixir
Paul Taylor - vocals, keyboards on track 7
Phil Denton - guitar, keyboards on track 7
Norman Gordon - guitar
Kevin Dobbs - bass
Nigel Dobbs - drums

Production
Martin Stansfield - engineer

References

External links
 Elixir official webpage

1986 debut albums
New Wave of British Heavy Metal albums